Vadi Ahmad (also Romanized as Vādī Aḩmad; also known as Vādīḩamad) is a village in Bandar Charak Rural District, Shibkaveh District, Bandar Lengeh County, Hormozgan Province, Iran. At the 2006 census, its population was 57, in 13 families.

References 

Populated places in Bandar Lengeh County